The Centre for International Governance Innovation (CIGI, pronounced "see-jee") is an independent, non-partisan think tank on global governance. CIGI supports research, forms networks, advances policy debate and generates ideas for multilateral governance improvements. CIGI's interdisciplinary work includes collaboration with policy, business and academic communities around the world. 

Until September 2014, CIGI was headquartered in the former Seagram Museum in the uptown district of Waterloo, Ontario. It is now situated in the CIGI Campus, which also houses the CIGI Auditorium and the Balsillie School of International Affairs (BSIA).

History
CIGI was founded in 2001 by Jim Balsillie, then co-CEO of Research In Motion (BlackBerry). Balsillie made an initial donation of $20 million to establish the New Economy Institute (renamed CIGI in 2002), with Mike Lazaridis, his then co-CEO at RIM, contributing an additional $10 million. The combined $30 million in funds was matched by the Government of Canada in 2003.

Among CIGI's first staff was its initial executive director John English, director of public affairs John Milloy and distinguished fellows Andrew F. Cooper and Paul Heinbecker. The first CIGI International Board of Governors (IBG) meeting was held in October 2003, with early members including Jagdish Bhagwati, Joe Clark, José Ángel Gurría, and Anne-Marie Slaughter.
 
In 2005, CIGI published its first working paper. In 2007, CIGI partnered with the University of Waterloo and Wilfrid Laurier University to launch the BSIA. In 2009, CIGI announced plans to house the BSIA within a "CIGI Campus" that would be built alongside its headquarters in Waterloo. The resulting $69 million complex received federal and provincial funding totalling $50 million through the Knowledge Infrastructure Program and Ontario's 2009 budget. The City of Waterloo donated the land for the campus through a 99-year lease. Construction of the CIGI Campus was completed in November 2011.

In May 2012, Rohinton P. Medhora joined CIGI as president, after having served on CIGI's International Board of Governors since 2009. Medhora is former vice president of programs at the International Development Research Centre (IDRC). Medhora succeeded former CIGI executive director by Thomas A. Bernes, who previously held high-level positions at the International Monetary Fund, the World Bank and the Government of Canada.

The centre was downsized in 2019 when 21 jobs were cut and again in 2020 when another 11 positions were eliminated according to a news report. The Budget was reduced to $8 million from the previous $12 million. These steps were necessary because the Government of Ontario cut all funding (approximately $3.2 million per annum) in 2019. A statement from CIGI stated that it would make "meaningful changes in how we operate, including streamlined decision-making, improved strategic planning and expanded partnerships". The organization's financial report at the end of July 2019 indicated that CIGI remained well-funded with $175 million in assets.

In 2019, CIGI ranked 30th globally out of 8,000+ think tanks in the Global Go To Think Tank Index.

Research initiatives
While CIGI's early research focused solely on international relations and the international economy. The centre's research has since evolved and expanded. CIGI's 2020–2025 Strategic Plan defines a new era for the organization focused on one of the most pressing issues of our time: digital governance that crosscuts topics related to big data and platform governance and builds upon existing expertise in the areas of security, trade, law and economics.

Publications
CIGI publishes peer-reviewed papers, special reports, policy briefs and conference reports that are outputs of its research programs. These publications are available for free download through a Creative Commons license. CIGI also publishes books under its CIGI Press imprint, which are the result of special projects and research by CIGI fellows and scholars. Titles include: Schism: America, China and the Fracturing of the Global Trading System; Laid Low: Inside the Crisis That Overwhelmed Europe and the IMF; Look Who’s Watching: Surveillance, Treachery and Trust Online; Complexity’s Embrace: The International Law Implications of Brexit; Reflections on Canada’s Past, Present and Future in International Law; Tug of War: Negotiating Security in Eurasia; and The Fabric of Peace in Africa: Looking beyond the State. CIGI's books are distributed globally through McGill-Queen's University Press, and are available via multiple e-book platforms and libraries.

Partners
Since its inception, CIGI has partnered with other think tanks and organizations from around the world. Current partnerships include the Institute for New Economic Thinking, an organization founded by George Soros in the wake of the financial crisis of 2007–2008; The Africa Portal, an online resource that seeks to broaden the availability, accessibility and use of policy research on issues critical to the future of Africa; The Balsillie School of International Affairs which is a unique three-way partnership among CIGI, Wilfrid Laurier University and the University of Waterloo; The Canada-India Track 1.5 Dialogue on Innovation, Growth and Prosperity, a three-year initiative between the Centre and Gateway House: Indian Council on Global Relations; The Forum on Information and Democracy, an international entity led by Reporters Without Borders to implement the International Partnership on Information and Democracy; and The Lancet & Financial Times Commission, Governing Health Futures 2030: Growing Up in a Digital World.

Facilities

After purchasing the former Seagram Museum from the City of Waterloo, CIGI moved into the facility in 2003. Designed by Barton Myers Associates, Inc., the Governor General Medal–winning building houses CIGI's main offices for staff and fellows, and provides a number of unique spaces for public events and workshops. Since 2010, the building also contains the CIGI Broadcast Studio, available to news organizations for television and radio interviews of CIGI experts.  CIGI also hosts the CIGI Campus Library, featuring the John Holmes Collection, which began as the library of the Canadian Institute of International Affairs (CIIA) in 1928.

References

Sources
https://web.archive.org/web/20110713045056/http://www.intelligentwaterloo.com/en/press.shtml
https://web.archive.org/web/20100918082826/http://www.macleans.ca/article.jsp?content=20050418_103887_103887
https://web.archive.org/web/20111014023714/http://www.ssrresourcecentre.org/ebook/
https://web.archive.org/web/20111027013318/http://ineteconomics.org/CIGI
https://archive.today/20140317152654/http://www.central-bank-communication.net/events/2013/09/walking-the-talk-challenges-for-monetary-policy-ac.../

External links
CIGI's official website
The CIGI Campus official website
Balsillie School of International Affairs
  (publications fulltext)

2001 establishments in Ontario
Waterloo, Ontario
Political and economic think tanks based in Canada
Organizations based in Ontario